Jehue Gordon (born 15 December 1991) is a Trinidadian track and field athlete who specialises in the 400 metres hurdles. He turned professional on 24 June 2010, and signed a deal with Adidas in August 2010.

Formerly a pupil of Belmont Boys' Secondary R.C. School and Queen's Royal College in Port of Spain, he began his international athletics career  at the 2008 World Junior Championships in Athletics, where he finished fifth in the semi-finals at the age of 16. He was the bronze medallist in the 400 m hurdles at the 2008 CARIFTA Games and went on to win the gold medal the following year, recording a championship record of 50.01 seconds. His success continued in the form of a bronze medal at the 2009 Central American and Caribbean Championships in Athletics, where he ran a time of 49.45 seconds, and a silver at the 2009 Pan American Junior Athletics Championships.

He qualified for the 2009 World Championships in Athletics and surprised by setting a world-age best and senior national record of 48.66 seconds in the heats. He progressed through the rounds and reached the final, finishing in fourth with a 48.26-second national record. Statisticians A. Lennart Julin and Mirko Jalava picked out Gordon's performances as sign of promise for future success. At the start of the 2010 season, he took a 400 m and 110 metres hurdles double at the trials for the CARIFTA Games. He went on to improve the championship records in both the 110 and 400 m hurdles at the 2010 CARIFTA Games, earning himself that year's Austin Sealy Trophy.

International competitions

References

External links

1991 births
Living people
Trinidad and Tobago male hurdlers
Olympic athletes of Trinidad and Tobago
Athletes (track and field) at the 2012 Summer Olympics
Athletes (track and field) at the 2016 Summer Olympics
Pan American Games gold medalists for Trinidad and Tobago
Pan American Games medalists in athletics (track and field)
Athletes (track and field) at the 2015 Pan American Games
Commonwealth Games silver medallists for Trinidad and Tobago
Commonwealth Games bronze medallists for Trinidad and Tobago
Commonwealth Games medallists in athletics
Athletes (track and field) at the 2014 Commonwealth Games
World Athletics Championships athletes for Trinidad and Tobago
Alumni of Queen's Royal College, Trinidad
World Athletics Championships winners
Medalists at the 2015 Pan American Games
Medallists at the 2014 Commonwealth Games